The Augusto B. Legaspi Sports & Cultural Complex is an indoor sporting arena located in Kalibo, Aklan, Philippines. It was constructed in 1993 inside the Godofredo P. Ramos Park fronting the Provincial Capitol of Aklan. Several events are being held here like concerts, basketball games, social gatherings, graduations, and other activities that the facilities may cater. It was named in honor of a former governor of the Province. The facility is primarily used for basketball games.

Basketball venues in the Philippines
Indoor arenas in the Philippines
Kalibo
Buildings and structures in Aklan
Sports in Aklan